Governor Leon Guerrero may refer to:

Lou Leon Guerrero (born 1950), Senator in the Guam Legislature and current Governor of Guam
Manuel Flores Leon Guerrero (1914–1985), Senator in the Guam Legislature and former Governor of Guam

Disambiguation pages